Carrington is a village in the Parish of Saint Philip in Barbados.

Notable residents 
 George Lamming

References 

Populated places in Barbados
Saint Philip, Barbados